WYSE (970 AM) is a radio station located in Canton, North Carolina, that simulcasts WISE's sports format from Asheville, North Carolina. Owned by the Asheville Radio Group subsidiary of Saga Communications, the station is licensed by the Federal Communications Commission to broadcast with 5,000 Watts of power during the day and 30 Watts at night.

The station is an affiliate of the Atlanta Braves radio network, the largest radio affiliate network in Major League Baseball.

History
970 AM signed on in 1954 as WWIT (call letters stood for "W"here "W"heels of  "T"urn). WWIT was daytime-only and broadcast with only 1,000 watts. It featured a Big Band format that gave way to a Top 40 format by the late 1950s. Teenagers at that time considered Nathaniel Lowery )"Nat the Cat"), an afternoon host, a favorite disc jockey. "Nat the Cat" introduced the region to jazz, rock 'n' rock, and gospel music produced by Black and white musicians at a time when schools and churches were segregated in Western North Carolina. Bob Caldwell of WLOS worked at WWIT in the early 1960s. The station was known on the air as "Big-IT" and "97-IT"  by the late 1970s. The station was purchased by Dan Greene from Sid Watts in 1974. Greene switched back and forth with longtime legend Jimmy Haney working the popular morning drivetime slot. He worked for a power increase for several years and in 1979, WWIT increased its signal to 5,000 watts, but was still daytime only. The Top 40 format, now known as CHR, continued until the mid-1980s when it gradually switched over to adult contemporary .Greene sold the station in 1984. Prior to 1992, WWIT aired Pisgah High School football. The station was sold in 1994, to a new company that took the station Classic rock as "970 WWIT". It eventually went into bankruptcy by 2000 and was sold, becoming WBCG with a country music format.

In September 2001, the station was sold to another company that switched the station to Oldies and reclaimed the WWIT call letters. It was sold to Saga Communications in 2003 and became a full-time simulcast of the WOXL-FM oldies format. The station again dropped the WWIT call letters for WOXL. It became WLZR in 2005 and WYSE in 2006.

Previous logo

References

External links

YSE
Fox Sports Radio stations
Radio stations established in 1954
1954 establishments in North Carolina